KF Golemi is an Albanian football (soccer) club based in Golem, Kavajë. The club is currently not competing in the senior football league.

History
Golemi FC was established on October 14, 2013 thanks to the initiative of the local government and mayor Agron Agalliu.

See also
 Besa Kavajë
 Luzi United
 FK Egnatia

References

Football clubs in Kavajë
Football clubs in Albania